Propebela angulosa is a species of sea snail, a marine gastropod mollusk in the family Mangeliidae.

Description
The length of the shell attains 12 mm. Its characteristics are close to Propebela cancellata (Mighels & C. B. Adams, 1842)

The solid elongate-fusiform shell is white. The spire is turreted. The shell contains 7 whorls. The suture is distinct and deeply impressed. The longitudinal sculpture shows about 14 elevated ribs. The spiral sculpture consists of many striae, mostly below the carina.

Distribution
This species was found in the Barentz Sea.

References

 Brunel, P.; Bosse, L.; Lamarche, G. (1998). Catalogue of the marine invertebrates of the estuary and Gulf of St. Lawrence. Canadian Special Publication of Fisheries and Aquatic Sciences, 126. 405 p.
 Gofas, S.; Le Renard, J.; Bouchet, P. (2001). Mollusca. in: Costello, M.J. et al. (eds), European Register of Marine Species: a check-list of the marine species in Europe and a bibliography of guides to their identification. Patrimoines Naturels. 50: 180–213
 Bogdanov I. (1990). Mollusks of Oenopotinae Subfamily (Gastropoda, Pectinibranchia, Turridae) in the seas of the USSR. Leningrad 221 p

External links
  Sars, G.O. (1878). Bidrag til Kundskaben om Norges arktiske Fauna. I. Mollusca Regionis Arcticae Norvegiae. Oversigt over de i Norges arktiske Region Forekommende Bløddyr. Brøgger, Christiania. xiii + 466 pp., pls 1–34 & I-XVIII
 Nekhaev, Ivan O. "Marine shell-bearing Gastropoda of Murman (Barents Sea): an annotated check-list." Ruthenica 24.2 (2014): 75

angulosa
Gastropods described in 1878